The Diplomatic Corpse is a 1958 British comedy thriller film directed by Montgomery Tully and starring Robin Bailey, Susan Shaw and Liam Redmond. It was produced as a second feature by ACT Films. The film's sets were designed by the art director Joseph Bato.

Plot
A crime reporter, assisted by his girlfriend, a fashion reporter at the same newspaper, investigates a dead body taken out of the River Thames. They are soon able to link it with a foreign embassy, making it a sensitive diplomatic matter.

Cast
 Robin Bailey as Mike Billings  
 Susan Shaw as Jenny Drew  
 Liam Redmond as Inspector Corcoran  
 Harry Fowler as Knocker Parsons  
 André Mikhelson as Hamid  
 Bill Shine as Humphrey Garrad  
 Charles Farrell as Percy Simpson  
 Maya Koumani as Marian Koumaya  
 Nicholas Bruce as Karim
 Peter Bathurst as Cartwright 
 John Briggs as Johnny, copy boy 
 Frank Hawkins as Police Sergeant
 George Street as Station Police Sergeant
 Eleanor Leigh

Production
Producer Francis Searle recalled the film "was a near-disaster. We had cast Ursula Howells; then, at the very last moment, she was taken sick and couldn’t appear. I then had to find another artiste quickly. We finished up with Susan Shaw and she was all right."

References

Bibliography
 Chibnall, Steve & McFarlane, Brian. The British 'B' Film. Palgrave MacMillan, 2009.

External links

1958 films
British comedy thriller films
1950s comedy thriller films
Films set in London
Films directed by Montgomery Tully
1958 comedy films
1950s English-language films
1950s British films